José Suárez may refer to:

 José Suárez (actor) (1919–1981), Spanish film actor
 José Suárez (pitcher/outfielder) (1891–?), Cuban baseball player in the Negro leagues
 José Suárez (baseball, born 1998), Venezuelan Major League Baseball player
 José David Suárez (born 1953), Cuban volleyball player

See also
 José Suárez Carreño (1915–2002), Spanish writer